(born April 28, 1969) is a Japanese composer best known for composing and arranging the music for Konami music video games, including the Dance Dance Revolution and Bemani series.

Biography 
Maeda composed music for Konami's Bemani music game series, beginning in 1998. For the following eight years, he served as the lead sound producer for the Dance Dance Revolution arcade series, up until the release of DDR SuperNOVA. Early editions of the game relied heavily on Maeda's music compositions, and as such, some of his songs are considered favorites by fans. In 2007, Maeda shifted to a sound director role for Nintendo Wii console releases of DDR, while maintaining a sound advisory position for subsequent DDR arcade releases. He left Konami in 2013, and was working for Capcom.

External links
Konami profile  

1969 births
Capcom people
Japanese composers
Japanese electronica musicians
Japanese male composers
Japanese male musicians
Japanese music arrangers
Konami people
Living people
Musicians from Osaka Prefecture
People from Toyonaka, Osaka
Video game composers